Brohisaurus is a genus of titanosauriform sauropod dinosaur from the Late Jurassic, based on largely indeterminate fragments of some ribs, vertebrae, and limb bones. The type and only species, B. kirthari, was described by M. Sadiq Malkani in 2003 and it is currently the only valid genus of dinosaur known from Pakistan to date. The genus name means "Baluchi lizard" and refers to the Baluchi people who live in the area where it was found. The species name refers to the Kirthar Mountains. The fossils were discovered in the lowest portion of the Kimmeridgian Sembar Formation from the Kirthar foldbelt in Pakistan.

Description
Baluchisaurus, like all sauropod dinosaurs, would have been a large-bodied, long-necked herbivore. Its femur was only 12 cm across. The 15 to 20 meter long titanosauriform Phuwiangosaurus, by contrast, had a femur 20 cm in diameter.

Classification
Brohisaurus was originally described as a titanosaur. Malkani suggested it was similar to the early African titanosaur Malawisaurus, arguing that this provided evidence for a biogeographic link between the Indian subcontinent and Africa. However, the phylogenetic position of Brohisaurus is not clear. None of the proposed traits uniting it to Titanosauria are definitive synapomorphies of that clade. It does appear to possess at least two synapomorphies of the Titanosauriformes: pneumatic cavities in its thoracic ribs and femora with elliptical cross sections.

References 

Macronarians
Kimmeridgian life
Late Jurassic dinosaurs of Asia
Fossils of Pakistan
Fossil taxa described in 2003